Hassan Damluji (Arabic: حسن الدملوجي) is a British-Iraqi development expert who serves as Deputy Director  at the Bill and Melinda Gates Foundation. He is the author of the Responsible Globalist, published by Penguin Allen Lane in 2019, and described by Bill Gates as "Thought provoking and well-written... a good read for people who care about solving global problems.". He is married to fashion entrepreneur Anna Jewsbury.

Biography 
Damluji was born in London as Hassan Al-Damluji. He later changed his name by removing the aristocratic epithet "Al". His father moved to the UK from Baghdad in 1970 and his mother is originally Irish. He is the nephew of Iraqi politician and women's rights campaigner Maysoon Al-Damluji. He is Deputy Director at the Bill and Melinda Gates Foundation where he leads a global team responsible for policy and advocacy across the Middle East, Pakistan, Japan and Korea.

Damluji is a board member of the Lives & Livelihoods Fund, a $2.5 billion fund which is the "largest ever Middle-East based, fully-multilateral development initiaitve", according to Gulf News.

Published works 
His book The Responsible Globalist: What Citizens of the World Can Learn from Nationalism  was published in 2019. Praise for the book includes from actor Riz Ahmed: "Visionary. . . A must-read for anyone who wants solutions to our most important problems"; screenwriter Richard Curtis "This is the book I would have written if I were smart enough"; and philanthropist and founder of Microsoft Bill Gates "Thought provoking and well-written... a good read for people who care about solving global problems. Damluji puts forth ideas that can help make global systems more successful."

List of Publications

Books 

 The Responsible Globalist (London: Allen Lane, 2019),

Articles 

 "Global cooperation is under threat - here's how to revive it", City AM (September 2019)
 "A travel ban won't prevent extremism, it will make it worse", The Guardian (January 2017)
 "Applying business sense to philanthropy in the Gulf", The National (November 2015)
 "Teaching the British reduces the killing", The New Statesman (March 2008)

Awards 
He has been named every year since 2015 as one of the 100 most influential Arabs under 40, by Arabian Business.

References 

Alumni of the University of Oxford
Harvard University alumni
Living people
British people of Iraqi descent
Bill & Melinda Gates Foundation
People in international development
Year of birth missing (living people)
21st-century British male writers
Alumni of Corpus Christi College, Oxford